Robert Thompson (b 1830) was a state legislator in Mississippi. He served in the Mississippi House of Representatives in 1874 and 1875 from Lowndes County, Mississippi. He was born in South Carolina and worked as a laborer.

He served on a committee with six others to investigate contested election cases.

He later moved to Noxubee County, Mississippi where he lived with his wife Eliza and children.

See also
African-American officeholders during and following the Reconstruction era

References

Members of the Mississippi House of Representatives
African-American politicians during the Reconstruction Era
People from Lowndes County, Mississippi
People from Noxubee County, Mississippi
1830 births
Year of death missing
African-American state legislators in Mississippi